Alison Riske defeated Kiki Bertens in the final, 0–6, 7–6(7–3), 7–5, to win the women's singles title at the 2019 Rosmalen Grass Court Championships. Riske saved five championship points en route to winning her second career WTA Tour singles title, her first in five years.

Aleksandra Krunić was the defending champion, but she lost to Kirsten Flipkens in the first round in a rematch of the previous year's final.

Seeds

Draw

Finals

Top half

Bottom half

Qualifying

Seeds

Qualifiers

Lucky losers

Draw

First qualifier

Second qualifier

Third qualifier

Fourth qualifier

Fifth qualifier

Sixth qualifier

References

External links
 Main Draw
 Qualifying Draw

Libéma Open - Singles
2019 Women's Singles